James C. "Jim" Dawkins Jr. is a retired United States Air Force lieutenant general who served as Deputy Chief of Staff for Strategic Deterrence and Nuclear Integration of the United States Air Force from 2020 to 2023. He previously served as the director of global power programs of the Office of the Assistant Secretary of the Air Force for Acquisition, Technology and Logistics.

Effective dates of promotions

References

Baylor University alumni
Embry–Riddle Aeronautical University alumni
Living people
Place of birth missing (living people)
Recipients of the Air Force Distinguished Service Medal
Recipients of the Defense Superior Service Medal
Recipients of the Legion of Merit
United States Air Force generals
United States Air Force personnel of the War in Afghanistan (2001–2021)
Year of birth missing (living people)